The Beauty of Destruction is the debut studio album by American metalcore band Devil You Know, later known as Light the Torch. It was released on April 25, 2014, in Europe and on April 29 in North America, the UK, and France through Nuclear Blast. It was produced by Logan Mader and mixed by Zeuss. The music video was released by Nuclear Blast Records and featured members Ryan Wombacher on bass and Roy Lev-Ari on guitar. Artwork for the album was created by noted painter and illustrator Travis Smith.

Track listing

Personnel
Devil You Know
 Howard Jones – vocals
 Francesco Artusato – guitar, bass guitar
 John Sankey – drums, percussion

Production
 Logan Mader – producer, composer
 Zeuss – mixing
Ted Jensen at Sterling Sound, NYC – mastering
 Artwork by Travis Smith

References

Devil You Know (band) albums
2014 debut albums